Tom Brown and Louise Brough were the defending champions, but decided not to play together. Brown partnered with Margaret Osborne but lost in the semifinals to Colin Long and Nancye Bolton. Brough partnered with John Bromwich, and they defeated Long and Bolton in the final, 1–6, 6–4, 6–2 to win the mixed doubles tennis title at the 1947 Wimbledon Championships.

Seeds

  John Bromwich /  Louise Brough (champions)
  Tom Brown /  Margaret Osborne (semifinals)
  Colin Long /  Nancye Bolton (final)
  Lennart Bergelin /  Doris Hart (semifinals)

Draw

Finals

Top half

Section 1

Section 2

Section 3

Section 4

The nationality of Miss M Koettlitz is unknown.

Bottom half

Section 5

Section 6

Section 7

Section 8

References

External links

X=Mixed Doubles
Wimbledon Championship by year – Mixed doubles